Pseudonagoda siniaevi is a species of moth of the family Limacodidae. It is found in India (southern Andamans).

The wingspan is about 27 mm. Adults have a black ground colour. The wings are extensively hyaline with rare grey scale-covering. The forewings and hindwings costal and lower margins are densely covered with black scales. The forewing is elongate and the discal vein is marked by black scales. Adults have been recorded in early March.

Etymology
The species is named for Mr. Viktor V. Siniaev.

References

Limacodidae
Moths described in 2009
Moths of Asia